Sherwood is the eponymous debut EP by the band Sherwood, released in 2004.

Track listing
The Summer Sends Its Love – 3:40
Please Wait Up For Me – 3:25
The Push Game – 3:20
Pray Forgive Me These Mistakes – 1:55
Under a Lamp – 3:51
(Anything) You Choose – 3:42
I'll See That You Aren't Woken Up – 3:46
My Dear Friend (iTunes bonus track) – 1:55

References

2004 debut EPs
Sherwood (band) EPs